The 2014–15 season was Chelsea Football Club's 101st competitive season, 26th consecutive season in the top flight of English football, 23rd consecutive season in the Premier League, and 109th year in existence as a football club. In addition to the domestic league, Chelsea participated in the UEFA Champions League after qualifying directly for the group stage by finishing third in the league last season. The club secured its fourth Premier League title by beating Crystal Palace on 3 May 2015.

The season was the first since 2000–01 without Frank Lampard, who joined Manchester City and later New York City FC.

Kits
Supplier: adidas / Sponsor: Samsung

Month by month review

June

Midfielder and all-time top scorer Frank Lampard left the Blues after 13 trophy-laden years, having played 648 games and scoring 211 goals. During his Chelsea career, he won 13 trophies, including three Premier Leagues, four FA Cups, two League Cups, one Europa League and one Champions League.

Chelsea announced the signing of former Arsenal midfielder Cesc Fàbregas from Barcelona for £27 million. He was given the number 4 shirt vacated after the departure of David Luiz to Paris Saint-Germain on a five-year contract. David Luiz's transfer was completed just a day after the signing of Fàbregas and the Brazilian left the Blues having played 143 games and scoring 12 goals.

July
On 1 July, Ashley Cole departed Chelsea after eight years. He left after winning one Premier League, four FA Cups, one League Cup and one Champions League. Along with Cole leaving Stamford Bridge, Samuel Eto'o, Henrique Hilário and Sam Hutchinson left as well.

On the same day, Mark Schwarzer signed a new one-year extension. Chelsea also announced that they agreed a fee with Atlético Madrid for Striker Diego Costa, thought to be in the region of £32 million, and eventually signed him on 15 July.

On 16 July, Chelsea announced that they had agreed a fee with Atlético Madrid for left back Filipe Luís, thought to be for about £16 million, subject to a medical and agreeing personal terms, whilst Beşiktaş announced that they had agreed a deal to sign Demba Ba from the Blues for a reported £4.7 million. Ba left the Blues having played 51 games and scoring 14 goals. The same day, a youthful Chelsea team comfortably defeated League 2 side Wycombe Wanderers 5–0 in their first pre-season friendly at Adams Park in Buckinghamshire.

On 18 July, Filipe Luís officially became a Chelsea player, being given the shirt number 5, vacated by Michael Essien who had worn the number from 2005 until his departure in January 2014. It was also confirmed that his teammate at Atlético Madrid and now Chelsea, Diego Costa, would take the number 19 shirt, vacated by Demba Ba, who had held the number since Paulo Ferreira left the club in the summer of 2013. Also that day, another very youthful Chelsea team narrowly defeated another League 2 side Wimbledon in their second pre-season friendly at Kingsmeadow in southwest London, winning the match 3–2 after being two goals down at half-time; the comeback was aided by a few senior players brought on for the second-half. The next day, Chelsea announced that Filipe Luís will get the shirt number 3 while the shirt number 5 will be given to 19-year-old French defender Kurt Zouma.

Chelsea Didier Drogba re-signed for Chelsea from Galatasaray for free on a one-year deal. Drogba's last kick for the Blues was the final penalty in the 2012 UEFA Champions League Final, which won the Champions League for Chelsea for the first time. In the new season, Drogba will wear the number 15 shirt; his former number 11 shirt had been given to Oscar. Drogba, however, reclaimed his former number 11 after Oscar was handed number 8, last worn by Frank Lampard.

Romelu Lukaku departed the Blues for £28 million to Everton, leaving after playing 12 games for Chelsea and scoring zero goals, while Ryan Bertrand was sent on a season-long loan to Southampton, his sixth loan spell for the Blues.

August
Defensive midfielder Oriol Romeu signed on a season long loan for Bundesliga club VfB Stuttgart. Chelsea travelled to Istanbul to take on Fenerbahçe and Beşiktaş in a small three-team tournament. Chelsea beat Fenerbahçe 2–0 with goals from Diego Costa and Branislav Ivanović. The Blues, however, then lost to Beşiktaş 1–0, also opposing former Blue, Demba Ba.

Chelsea began their 2014–15 Premier League campaign with a 1–3 victory against Burnley on 18 August at Turf Moor. Chelsea surrendered the first goal in the 13th minute, but three minutes later, Costa smashed home a close-range shot to level the score. A pass from Cesc Fàbregas then set up an André Schürrle goal to break the deadlock, and Ivanović provided the final goal of the match from a corner in the 34th minute. This match marked the first competitive action for new signings Costa, Fàbregas and Thibaut Courtois, who started in goal after a three-year loan spell at Atlético Madrid. Didier Drogba also made his return appearance to the Chelsea squad, coming off the bench in the second-half.

Chelsea won their first competitive home match with a 2–0 victory against Leicester City on 24 August at Stamford Bridge. Costa scored his second goal in two matches followed by Eden Hazard's first goal of the season. Courtois claimed his first clean sheet of his Chelsea career.

On 29 August, Fernando Torres signed a two-year loan deal with Milan. Chelsea's next game was a nine-goal thriller away against Everton, a game which Chelsea won 3–6, with Costa scoring a brace.

On 31 August, Loïc Rémy transferred to Chelsea from Queens Park Rangers for £10.5 million on a four-year deal.

September
On transfer deadline day, Chelsea sent three players on loan—Jamal Blackman joined Patrick Bamford on loan at Middlesbrough, Marco van Ginkel signed on a year-long loan at Milan and Nathaniel Chalobah joined Premier League club Burnley. Chelsea have currently sent 26 players out on loan, the most in the Premier League. After the international break, Diego Costa was named Player of the Month for August after scoring four goals in three games and sending Chelsea to the top of the table.

On 13 September, Chelsea played their second game of the season at Stamford Bridge against Swansea City. Chelsea won the game 4–2 with Costa scoring his first hat-trick for Chelsea and Rémy scoring on his debut.

Chelsea began their 2014–15 Champions League with a 1–1 draw at home to Schalke 04. Fàbregas grabbed his first Chelsea goal but it was cancelled out by Klaas-Jan Huntelaar, who scored with 28 minutes left to secure a point for Schalke. Chelsea dropped their first points of the season. Chelsea dropped their first points of the 2014–15 Premier League season as they drew 1–1 to reigning champions Manchester City at the Etihad Stadium. In a close fought-encounter, Pablo Zabaleta was sent off after 66 minutes, giving Chelsea the advantage and allowing Schürrle to givethe Blues the lead. With only five minutes to go, Chelsea looked like they were going to stretch their winning run to five games, however former Blues vice-captain Frank Lampard scored. Despite the draw, Chelsea still remained three points clear at the top of the table on 13 points.

In Chelsea's next match, they knocked Bolton Wanderers out of the League Cup Third Round after winning 2–1 thanks to a debut goal from defender Zouma and a strike from Oscar. The result meant Chelsea faced Shrewsbury Town in the League Cup Fourth Round. Chelsea's last game in the league for September came against Aston Villa, a game which was won 3–0, meaning they finished September at the top of the table. It was announced that Chelsea had enquired about temporarily relocating to Twickenham Stadium whilst redeveloping Stamford Bridge. The final game of the month was in the Champions League against Sporting CP in Portugal. Nemanja Matić scored the only goal of the game, giving Chelsea a 0–1 win and leaving them top of their group

October

Chelsea began October with a derby match and a 2–0 victory over local rivals Arsenal. A first half penalty by Eden Hazard and the ninth goal of the season for Diego Costa sent the Blues five points clear at the top of the table ahead of the international break.

Chelsea preserved their five-point lead at the top as they defeated Crystal Palace at Selhurst Park, 1–2. Three days later, they continued their form into the Champions League defeating Maribor 6–0 at Stamford Bridge. Goals from Rémy, Drogba, Terry an own goal and two from Hazard sent Chelsea on their way to secure a record Champions League win, which also maintained their unbeaten start in all competitions this season. On 22 October, Chelsea's chief executive Ron Gourlay left the club, having held the position since 2009.

Chelsea drew for the second time in the league season away to Manchester United. Drogba's powerful header gave the Blues the lead, but a last minute equaliser from Robin van Persie meant the sides shared the points. The result rendered Chelsea four points clear of second-placed Southampton at the end of October.

Diego Costa, Thibaut Courtois and Eden Hazard were among the nominees for the 2014 FIFA Ballon d'Or, while José Mourinho was nominated for the 2014 FIFA World Coach of the Year.

In the Blues final game in October, they edged past League Two side Shrewsbury Town in the Football League Cup thanks to a third goal in three games from Drogba and an own goal. In the next round, they faced Derby County away.

November
Chelsea's first game of the month came against local rivals Queens Park Rangers, a brilliant first half goal from Oscar and a second-half penalty from Eden Hazard gave Chelsea a 2–1 win. Four days later, Chelsea came from behind to draw away to Maribor, with Matić scoring 20 minutes from full-time to keep Chelsea top of the group.

Chelsea's unbeaten start continued as they defeated Liverpool 1–2 at Anfield. Emre Can gave the Reds the lead before goals from Gary Cahill and Diego Costa sent the Blues seven points clear before the international break.

A dominating performance against West Bromwich Albion sent kept Chelsea seven points clear at the top of the table, thanks to goals from Costa and Hazard. The Blues secured qualification for the Second Round of the Champions League after hammering Schalke 04 0–5 at the Veltins-Arena. Chelsea's final game in November was a 0–0 stalemate away at Sunderland. Despite Chelsea failing to score for the first time in the season, they went six points clear of defending champions Manchester City at November's end.

December
Chelsea bounced back from their 0–0 draw to Sunderland to defeat London rivals Tottenham Hotspur 3–0 at Stamford Bridge. Goals from Hazard and Drogba, in for the suspended Costa, gave Chelsea a first half lead, before a goal from Rémy settled the game.

Chelsea suffered their first defeat of the 2014–15 season after losing 2–1 to Newcastle United at St James' Park. The Blues fell behind to two Papiss Cissé goals and Drogba pulled one back, but Mourinho's side failed to secure the equaliser as Manchester City closed the gap at the top to three points.

With the defeat to Newcastle behind them, the Blues defeated Sporting CP 3–1 at Stamford Bridge. Goals from Cesc Fàbregas, Schürrle, and John Obi Mikel sent Chelsea through to the next round as group winners. The Blues bounced back in the Premier League to regain a three-point advantage over Manchester City after dispatching Hull City 2–0 at Stamford Bridge with goals from Hazard and Costa.

Paris Saint-Germain faced Chelsea in the Champions League Round of 16. The first leg was held in Paris on Tuesday 17 February, and the second leg at Stamford Bridge on Wednesday 11 March. They faced each other in the 2013–14 Quarter Finals, where the Blues went through on away goals thanks to an 87th-minute goal from Demba Ba.

In the League Cup Quarter Finals Chelsea progressed by beating Derby County 3–1 at the iPro Stadium, where they faced 2012 winners Liverpool. A superb victory against Stoke City meant the Blues were on top at Christmas, goals from captain John Terry and Cesc Fàbregas gave José Mourinho a win against adversary Mark Hughes.

Terry scored for the second successive game as the Blues continued their form and defeated West Ham United 2–0 at Stamford Bridge. The Blues finished 2014 with a 1–1 draw away to Southampton, Sadio Mané's early goal was cancelled out by Eden Hazard and despite the Blues persistence they couldn't break down a resilient Saints.
 Despite the draw Chelsea regained a four-point lead over Manchester City as they slipped up at home to Burnley.

January
Chelsea started 2015 in disappointing fashion, falling to a 5–3 away defeat to Tottenham Hotspur. Five goals was the most José Mourinho had conceded as a manager in the Premier League, but despite the loss, the Blues remained top of the league on alphabetical order.

Loanees Patrick Bamford and Alex Davey had their loan deals extended to the end of the season, to Middlesbrough and Scunthorpe United respectively, while John Swift returned from his unsuccessful loan spell to Rotherham United and was subsequently sent to Swindon Town. Striker Alex Kiwomya was also sent to Barnsley on a one-month loan.

Chelsea started their FA Cup campaign with a 3–0 victory over Watford, with goals from Willian, Rémy and Zouma. Despite a superb first-half performance from Newcastle United and in particular Rémy Cabella, the Blues ran out 2–0 winners after goals from Oscar and Diego Costa.

José Mourinho recorded his biggest Premier League away win as Chelsea manager as the Blues hammered Swansea City 5–0, thanks to two doubles from Costa, Oscar and a goal from Schürrle. A week later, Chelsea threw away a two-goal lead and lost to League One side Bradford City in the FA Cup Fourth Round.

Chelsea progressed to the League Cup Final after defeating Liverpool on aggregate 2–1 in the Semi-finals. An early penalty from Hazard was cancelled out by a Raheem Sterling goal in the first leg, leaving the game 1–1 heading into the second leg at Stamford Bridge. The second leg finished 0–0 after 90 minutes before an Ivanović header after 94 minutes sent the Blues to the League Cup Final at Wembley to face Tottenham.

Striker Costa was banned for a stamp on Liverpool midfielder Emre Can, missing games against Manchester City, Aston Villa and Everton.

Chelsea finished January with a 1–1 draw at Stamford Bridge with second place Manchester City. The Blues took the lead through Rémy before David Silva equalised to prevent the lead at the top increasing to eight points.

February
Fiorentina winger Juan Cuadrado signed for Chelsea for an initial fee of £23.3 million. Cuadrado played a vital role in Colombia's run to the World Cup Quarter-finals. Schürrle moved to Wolfsburg on a £22 million deal, having played 65 games for Chelsea and scoring 14 goals, including vital goals against Paris Saint-Germain and Manchester City. Additionally, left back Ryan Bertrand made the permanent move to Southampton for £10 million after having spent the first half of the season on loan at the club.

Chelsea moved seven points clear of second-placed Manchester City after a hard-fought win over Aston Villa at Villa Park. The Blues then won 0–1 for the first time in all competitions after a late goal from Willian gave Chelsea a victory over Everton to keep the lead their lead at the top of the table at seven points.

Eden Hazard signed a new five-and-a-half-year deal with Chelsea, keeping him at the club until 2020. He had played 147 games to date and scored 44 goals while also winning the 2012–13 UEFA Europa League with the Blues.

Edinson Cavani's equaliser in the 54th minute denied Chelsea victory against PSG in the first leg of the Champions League round of 16. Ivanović gave the Blues the lead and looked set to give them victory at the Parc des Princes, but Edinson Cavani equalised, and it could have been worse for Chelsea yet Thibaut Courtois made a series of top saves to keep the Blues in the tie for the second leg at Stamford Bridge.

The Blues' final game in February was mired in controversy, as official Martin Atkinson had a poor game at Stamford Bridge. Ivanović gave Chelsea the lead, but two stonewall penalties were not given in Chelsea's favour, one for a handball and another for a blatant two-handed push on Costa. Matić was then sent off for retaliating to a challenge from Burnley's Ashley Barnes before Ben Mee equalised in the 81st minute. Chelsea appealed Matić's red card, and The Football Association reduced the ban from three games to two.

Two Chelsea players left the club—Lewis Baker left on loan to Milton Keynes Dons until the end of the season, while Hazard's younger brother Thorgan Hazard moved permanently to Borussia Mönchengladbach, signing a deal to keep him at the German club until 2020.

March

Chelsea's first game in March won José Mourinho his first trophy on his return to Chelsea after the Blues defeated Spurs 2–0 in the 2015 League Cup Final. Zouma replaced the suspended Matić in defensive midfield, and Petr Čech replaced Thibaut Courtois in goal. A goal from captain John Terry just before half-time sent Chelsea on their way and a Costa deflected effort, originally credited as a Kyle Walker own goal, gave the Blues the win. Credit to Costa was later confirmed on the official match scorecard on the Capital One Cup's website. Mourinho's win was his third Football League Cup and Chelsea's fifth overall; this win was also Čech, Drogba and Terry's third win. It was Chelsea's first domestic cup since the 2011–12 FA Cup and Chelsea's first major trophy in two years. The win also meant that Chelsea qualified for the 2015–16 UEFA Europa League Third qualifying round.

A Hazard header in the first-half gave the Blues victory over London rivals West Ham. The win kept the gap at the top at five points over Manchester City, with Chelsea having a game in hand.

Chelsea produced their worst performance of the season in arguably their most important game of the season. Ten-man PSG knocked out the Blues on away goals, and despite star forward Zlatan Ibrahimović being sent off after only 30 minutes, and Chelsea could not find a breakthrough with over 60 minutes with the man advantage. Goals from Cahill and Hazard looked to send the disappointing Blues through, but former Chelsea defender David Luiz scored in normal time and Thiago Silva scored in extra time to condemn Chelsea to defeat.

The Blues disappointing form continued as they drew 1–1 to Southampton at Stamford Bridge. Despite the draw, Chelsea extended their lead at the top to six points due to Manchester City's slip at Burnley. Chelsea rounded off March with a hard-fought 3–2 win over Hull City, early goals from Costa and Hazard sent the Blues on their way before two goals in the space of a minute sent Hull City level at the break. Costa went off with an injury after 75 minutes and his replacement Rémy scored moments later to send Chelsea six points clear with a game in hand.

Club captain Terry signed a new, one-year deal with the Blues, keeping him at the club until June 2016. Playing 650 times scoring 59 goals while also lifting a record 15 trophies, he is the most successful captain in the club's history.

April
The Blues started April with a hard-fought 2–1 home win against Stoke City. A first half penalty kick from Hazard sent Chelsea on their way before Charlie Adam scored from 65 yards to equalise, yet for the second game, Rémy netted a second-half winner. A week later, Chelsea battled to a 0–1 win at QPR, Fàbregas scoring with the Blues' only shot on target in the 88th minute to send them seven points clear of second-place Arsenal.

The Chelsea youth team won the second-ever 2014–15 UEFA Youth League, defeating Shakhtar Donetsk 3–2 in the final. Dominic Solanke finished as the competition's top scorer with 12 goals.

Hazard and Costa were then nominated for the PFA Players' Player of the Year, while Thibaut Courtois and Hazard were also nominated for the PFA Young Player of the Year, an accolade which Hazard received in the previous season; it was the third consecutive year that Hazard had been nominated in the PFA Players' Player of the Year and PFA Young Player of the Year.

A 1–0 home win over Manchester United extended the Blues lead at the top of the table to ten points. Hazard notched the only goal of the game in the 38th minute, after good work from Fàbregas and Oscar. Despite Manchester United having 70 percent of the ball's possession, they rarely troubled Courtois' goal and the Blues held resolute to record a 13th win in 16 games at Stamford Bridge.

Chelsea had a club-record six players named in the 2014–15 PFA Team of the Year. Defenders Ivanović, Terry and Cahill, and Hazard, Matić and Costa were all included, the latter two for the first time. Ivanović and Cahill had both been named once before, Terry received the honour for the fourth time and Hazard had his third consecutive nomination. Later that evening, the Belgian also won the PFA Player of the Year award.

Arsenal faced Chelsea in a match at the top of the table on 26 April. The match finished a 0–0 draw; Chelsea and the Blues regained their ten-point lead at the top of the table.

Following their victory in the 2014–15 UEFA Youth League, Chelsea Youth Team record a 5–2 aggregate victory over the Manchester City Elite Development Squad in the 2014–15 FA Youth Cup Final. The young Blues won the FA Youth Cup for a second consecutive season thanks to goals from Tammy Abraham, Dominic Solanke and Isaiah Brown over two legs.

The Blues rounded off April with a 3–1 away win over Leicester City. Despite conceding first, goals from Drogba, Terry and Ramires sent Chelsea 13 points clear at the top of the table, guaranteeing them a spot in 2015–16 UEFA Champions League group stage.

May

Chelsea secured their fourth Premier League trophy and their fifth top division trophy overall, after a 1–0 victory over Crystal Palace. A Hazard goal was enough to send the Blues 16 points clear and unable to be caught. This was José Mourinho's third Premier League and eighth title overall. The title victory also put him level with Arsène Wenger in the second-most Premier League wins behind Alex Ferguson. Chelsea had spent 253 days at the top of the Premier League table to date this season, and only Chelsea in 2005–06 (257 days) and Manchester United in 1993–94 (262 days) had been at the top of the table for longer in a single campaign. Due to the Blues securing the title against Palace, Chelsea spent 274 days at the top of the table and set a new record..
Mourinho continued his unbeaten run against Liverpool after drawing 1–1. The Blues goal came from Terry, who broke the record for the most goals by a defender in Premier League history. The Blues last away game of the year was a 0–3 defeat at West Brom. However, the game made no difference to either of the teams' league positions, yet it gave Mourinho the chance to assess youngsters Ruben Loftus-Cheek, Nathan Aké and Isaiah Brown in a league match. The Blues finished their season with a 3–1 victory over Sunderland at Stamford Bridge. Despite falling behind to an early goal, Costa and Rémy gave Chelsea all three points.

Chelsea finished the season as 2014–15 Premier League champions and winners of the 2014–15 Football League Cup. Mourinho's side broke numerous records on their way to the title, most significantly remaining top of the Premier League for 274 days and recording the fewest losses in all competitions. Terry became the first player since Gary Pallister to play in every minute of the title-winning campaign. Striker Drogba announced he was leaving the club for a second time. He left the Blues having scored a total of 164 goals in 381 appearances, and winning numerous trophies including the Premier League and UEFA Champions League.

Mourinho won the Premier League Manager of the Season and LMA Manager of the Year awards, while Hazard won a triple award at the end of the season, with the PFA Player of the Year, FWA Footballer of the Year and the Premier League Player of the Season awards. And at the end of season club awards, Zouma won the young player of the year, and Oscar won the goal of the year for his stunner with the outside of the box against QPR. Hazard won a second consecutive Chelsea Player of the Year and won the Players' Player of the Year award.

Club

Coaching staff
{|class="wikitable"
|-
!Position
!Staff
|-
| Manager|| José Mourinho
|-
|rowspan="3"|Assistant Manager|| Steve Holland
|-
| Silvino Louro
|-
| Rui Faria
|-
|Technical Director|| Michael Emenalo
|-
|Goalkeeper Coach|| Christophe Lollichon
|-
|Fitness Coach|| Chris Jones
|-
|Assistant Fitness Coach|| Carlos Lalin
|-
|Senior Opposition Scout|| Mick McGiven
|-
|Medical Director|| Paco Biosca
|-
|Assistant Medical Director|| Eva Carneiro
|-
|Head of Youth Development|| Neil Bath
|-
|Under 21 Team Manager|| Adi Viveash
|-
|Under 18 Team Manager|| Joe Edwards
|-
|Head of Match Analysis/Scout|| James Melbourne
|-
|International Head Coach|| Dermot Drummy
|-

Other information

|-
||Chief Executive|| Ron Gourlay (until 22 October)
|-
  Eugene Tenenbaum

First team squad

New contracts

Transfers

In

Summer

Winter

Out

Summer

Winter

Loan out

Summer

Winter

Overall transfer activity

Spending
Summer:  £85,300,000

Winter:  £23,300,000

Total:  £108,600,000

Income
Summer:  £75,200,000

Winter:  £37,585,000

Total:  £112,785,000

Expenditure
Summer:  £10,100,000

Winter:  £14,285,000

Total:  £4,185,000

Pre-season

Friendlies

Post-season

Friendlies

Competitions

Overall

Premier League

League table

Results summary

Results by matchday

Matches
The fixtures for the 2014–15 season were announced on 18 June 2014 at 9:00 BST.

FA Cup

League Cup

UEFA Champions League

Group stage

Knockout phase

Round of 16

Statistics

Appearances

Top scorers

The list is sorted by shirt number when total goals are equal.

Clean sheets

The list is sorted by shirt number when total appearances are equal.

Summary

Awards

Player

Manager

References

Chelsea
Chelsea F.C. seasons
Chelsea
English football championship-winning seasons